Lieutenant General Sir James Bevan Edwards  (5 November 1834 – 8 July 1922) was a senior British Army officer and politician.

Military career
Edwards was commissioned into the Royal Engineers in 1852. He served with the Royal Engineers in the Crimean War in 1853 and the Indian Mutiny of 1857.

He transferred to the Indian Staff Corps in 1882, and, during the Mahdist War, became Commanding Royal Engineer for the Suakin Expeditionary Force in 1885. He was mentioned in despatches for his role in this Expedition.

On return to the United Kingdom, Edwards became Commandant of the Royal School of Military Engineering. He was then appointed Commander of British Troops in China and Hong Kong in 1889.

Edwards was also selected by the British Government to inspect the forces of the Australian colonies in 1889 and to advise on their organisation. He recommended a structure to enable the colonies to combine for mutual defence, uniform organisation and armament, a common Defence Act, a military college to train officers and a uniform gauge for railways.

At the 1895 general election, he was elected to the House of Commons as Member of Parliament (MP) for Hythe in Kent, but he made his resignation from the British House of Commons in February 1899.

He became colonel-commandant of the Royal Engineers in 1903.

Edwards died in 1922 and is buried in Brompton Cemetery, London.

Family
Edwards married three times: in 1868 to Alice Brocklebank, daughter of Ralph Brocklebank; in 1901 to Nina Balfour, daughter of John Balfour; and, in 1918, Amy Ann Harding. He had several children, including:
Isabel Sybil Edwards (died 1956), who married in 1902 Colonel Edward Charles Walthall Delves Walthall, CMG, DSO, (1874–1961), an officer in the Royal Artillery.

References

External links
 

|-

1835 births
1922 deaths
Graduates of the Royal Military Academy, Woolwich
Royal Engineers officers
British Army lieutenant generals
British Army personnel of the Crimean War
British military personnel of the Indian Rebellion of 1857
British Army personnel of the Mahdist War
Members of the Parliament of the United Kingdom for English constituencies
Knights Commander of the Order of the Bath
Knights Commander of the Order of St Michael and St George
Burials at Brompton Cemetery
UK MPs 1895–1900
19th-century British Army personnel
20th-century British people